As a surname, Raglan may refer to:

Charlie Raglan (born 1993), English footballer
Clare Raglan (1927–2002), Canadian National Hockey League player
FitzRoy Somerset, Lord Raglan, British Army officer, commander of British troops during the Crimean War
Herb Raglan (born 1967), Canadian National Hockey League player, son of the above
James Raglan (1901–1961), British actor
Robert Raglan (1906–1985), British actor